William Kent Krueger (born November 16, 1950) is an American novelist and crime writer, best known for his series of novels featuring Cork O'Connor, which are set mainly in Minnesota. In 2005 and 2006, he won back-to-back Anthony Awards for best novel. In 2014, his stand-alone book Ordinary Grace won the Edgar Award for Best Novel of 2013. In 2019, This Tender Land was a on the New York Times bestseller list for nearly six months.

Biographical details
Krueger has said that he wanted to be a writer from the third grade when his story "The Walking Dictionary" was praised by his teacher and parents.

He attended Stanford University, but his academic path was cut short when he came into conflict with the university's administration during student protests of spring 1970. Throughout his early life, he supported himself by logging timber, digging ditches, working in construction, and being published as a freelance journalist; he never stopped writing.

He wrote short stories and sketches for many years, but it was not until the age of 40 that he finished the manuscript of his first novel, Iron Lake. It won the Anthony Award for Best First Novel, the Barry Award for Best First Novel, the Minnesota Book Award, and the Loft-McKnight Fiction Award.

Krueger is married and has two children. He lives in St. Paul, Minnesota.

Writing influences
Krueger has said his favorite book is To Kill a Mockingbird. He grew up reading Ernest Hemingway, John Steinbeck, F. Scott Fitzgerald, and James T. Farrell. Most influential among these was Hemingway. In an interview for Shots magazine, Krueger described his admiration for Hemingway's prose:
His prose is clean, his word choice perfect, his cadence precise and powerful. He wastes nothing. In Hemingway, what's not said is often the whole point of a story. I like that idea, leaving the heart off the page so that the words, the prose itself, is the first thing to pierce you. Then the meaning comes.

As a mystery genre writer, Krueger credits Tony Hillerman and James Lee Burke as his strongest influences.

Writing process
Krueger prefers to write early in the morning. He began writing in his 30s and had to make time for writing early in the morning before going to work at the University of Minnesota. Rising at 5:30 am, he would go to the nearby St. Clair Broiler, where he would drink coffee and write longhand in wire-bound notebooks. In return for his loyalty, the restaurant has hosted book launches for him. At one of them, the staff wore T-shirts emblazoned with "A nice place to visit. A great place to die." The St. Clair Broiler permanently closed in the fall of 2017.

Setting for the Cork O'Connor series
When Krueger decided to set the series in northern Minnesota, he realized that a large percentage of the population was of mixed ancestry. In college, he had wanted to become a cultural anthropologist; he became intrigued by researching the Ojibwe culture and weaving the information into his books. His books are set in and around Native American reservations. The main character, Cork O'Connor, is part Ojibwe and part Irish.

Krueger has read the first Ojibwe historian, William Whipple Warren, Gerald Vizenor and Basil Johnston. He has also read novels by Louise Erdrich and Jim Northrup. Krueger began to meet the Ojibwe people and because of his interest in their culture.

Krueger believes that the sense of place is made resonant by the actions and emotions of the characters within it. He describes it as "a dynamic bond that has the potential to heighten the drama of every scene."

Bibliography

Cork O'Connor 
Iron Lake
Pocket Books, Simon & Schuster, hardcover (1998), 
Pocket Books, Simon & Schuster, paperback (1999), 
Recorded Books (2010), 
Boundary Waters
Pocket Books, Simon & Schuster, hardcover (1999), 
Recorded Books (2010), 
Purgatory Ridge
Pocket Books, Simon & Schuster, hardcover (2001), 
Recorded Books (2010), 
Blood Hollow
Atria, Simon & Schuster, hardcover (2004), 
Pocket Books, Simon & Schuster, paperback (2005), 
Mercy Falls
Atria, Simon & Schuster, hardcover (2005), 
Pocket Books, Simon & Schuster, paperback (2006), 
Copper River
Atria, Simon & Schuster, hardcover (2006), 
Pocket Books, Simon & Schuster, paperback (2007), 
Thunder Bay
Atria, Simon & Schuster, hardcover (2007), 
Atria Books, trade paperback (2009), 
Red Knife
Atria Books, hardcover (2008), 
Atria Books, trade paperback (2009), 
Heaven's Keep
Atria Books, hardcover (2009), 
Atria Books, trade paperback (2010), 
Vermilion Drift
Atria Books, hardcover (2010), 
Atria Books, trade paperback (2011), 
Northwest Angle
Atria Books, hardcover (2011), 
Atria Books, trade paperback (2012), 
Trickster's Point
Atria Books, hardcover (2012), 
Atria Books, trade paperback (2013), 
Tamarack County
Atria Books, hardcover (2013), 
Atria Books, trade paperback (2014), 
Windigo Island
Atria Books, hardcover (2014), 
Atria Books, trade paperback (2015), 
Manitou Canyon
Atria Books, hardcover (2016), 
Atria Books, trade paperback (2017), 
Sulphur Springs
Atria Books, Simon & Schuster, Hardcover (2017), 
Atria Books, Simon & Schuster, Trade Paperback (2018), 
Desolation Mountain
Atria Books (2018), 
Lightning Strike
Atria Books (2021), 
Fox Creek
Atria Books (2022), ISBN 978-1982128715

Stand-alone novels 
 The Devil's Bed
Atria Books, Simon & Schuster, hardcover (2003), 
 Pocket Star paperback (2003)
 Ordinary Grace
 Atria Books, Simon & Schuster, hardcover (2013), 
Atria Books, Simon & Schuster, trade paperback (2014), 
 This Tender Land
 Atria Books, Simon & Schuster, hardcover (2019),

Anthologies 
"Hixton" in Crimes By Moonlight, Berkley Publishing  (ebook, 2010)
"Bums" in USA Noir, Akashic Books (soft cover, 2013)

Awards
Bush Artist Fellowship, 1988
Loft-McKnight Fiction Award, 1998 (forIron Lake)
Minnesota Book Award, 1999 (for Iron Lake)
Anthony Award for Best First Novel, 1999 (for Iron Lake)
Barry Award for Best First Novel, 1999 (for Iron Lake)
Friends of American Writers Prize, 1999
Minnesota Book Award, 2002 (for Purgatory Ridge)
Readers Choice Award, 2003
Anthony Award for Best Novel, 2005 (for Blood Hollow)
Anthony Award for Best Novel, 2006 (for Mercy Falls)
Minnesota Book Award, 2007 (for Copper River)
Northeastern Minnesota Book Award, 2007 (for Thunder Bay)
Dilys Award, 2008 (for Thunder Bay)
Minnesota Book Award, 2008 (for Thunder Bay)
Midwest Booksellers Choice Award, 2013 (for Ordinary Grace)
Edgar Award, 2013 (for Ordinary Grace)

References

External links

Interview with William Kent Krueger by Bruce Southworth on the Northern Lights Minnesota Author Interview TV Series #420 (1999): https://reflections.mndigital.org/catalog/p16022coll38:104#/kaltura_video
Reading by William Kent Krueger from Iron Lake for the 1999 Minnesota Book Awards program along with other nominees, Northern Lights TV Series #432 (1999):  https://reflections.mndigital.org/catalog/p16022coll38:208#/kaltura_video 

1950 births
Living people
20th-century American novelists
21st-century American novelists
American male novelists
American mystery writers
Novelists from Minnesota
Anthony Award winners
Barry Award winners
Dilys Award winners
Edgar Award winners
People from Torrington, Wyoming
20th-century American male writers
21st-century American male writers